The Best of The Doors is a compilation album by American rock group the Doors. Released in 1985, the double LP set contains 18 songs from their first six albums with lead singer Jim Morrison, including charting singles and selected album cuts. Danny Sugerman contributed a short essay which discussed the band's origins, influences and Morrison's personality, and was printed inside the gatefold sleeve.

When the album was released on compact disc in 1991, it reached number 32 in the U.S. and in the top twenty in several other countries. In February 2007, the album was certified as Diamond 10× by the Recording Industry Association of America.

Critical reception

In a retrospective review for AllMusic, Bruce Eder gave the album a rating of four and a half out of five stars. He commented that, when it was released in 1985, The Best of the Doors was the most comprehensive collection to date and provided a good overview. However, he noted:

Eder added that more recent albums, which also benefit from remastering, "renders this collection somewhat less attractive than it was on its initial release".

Track listing

Original album
All tracks are written by the Doors (Jim Morrison, Ray Manzarek, Robby Krieger and John Densmore), except as noted.  Details are taken from the 1985 U.S. Elektra release; other releases may show different information.

Note: On the CD version, "Alabama Song (Whiskey Bar)" is included as a bonus track between "Love Me Two Times" and "Five to One."

Personnel
Per album liner notes:

The Doors
 Jim Morrison – vocals, production
 Ray Manzarek – keyboards, production
 John Densmore – drums, production
 Robby Krieger – guitar, production

Technical
 Paul A. Rothchild – production
 Bruce Botnick – engineering, co-production

Charts

Weekly charts

Year-end charts

Certifications

See also
List of best-selling albums in the United States

References

1985 greatest hits albums
Albums produced by Paul A. Rothchild
Albums produced by Bruce Botnick
Elektra Records compilation albums
The Doors compilation albums